Sulufou is an artificial island built on the reef in the Lau Lagoon on Malaita in the Solomon Islands; it is located in Malaita Province. The road from Auki ends at Fouia wharf opposite the islands of Sulufou and Adaege in the Lau Lagoon.

References

Islands of the Solomon Islands